Centrahoma is a rural small town in Coal County, Oklahoma, United States. The population was 97 at the 2010 census.

History 
A post office was established at Byrd, Indian Territory on March 3, 1892.  It was named for William L. Byrd, Governor of the Chickasaw Nation.  Its name changed to Owl, Indian Territory on July 10, 1894.  The post office took its name from nearby Owl Creek, a branch of Leader Creek, a tributary of Clear Boggy Creek.  On June 11, 1907 the post office was moved a few miles northeast and the name changed to Centrahoma, Indian Territory.  Its name was coined from "central Oklahoma."

Geography
Centrahoma is located northwest of the center of Coal County at  (34.609299, -96.345053). Oklahoma State Highway 3 passes south of the community, leading northwest  to Ada and southeast  to Atoka.

As of 2015, the only business was a cafe; there were no services.

Demographics

As of the census of 2000, there were 110 people, 36 households, and 29 families residing in the city. The population density was 440.4 people per square mile (169.9/km2). There were 44 housing units at an average density of 176.2 per square mile (68.0/km2). The racial makeup of the city was 71.82% White, 22.73% Native American, and 5.45% from two or more races.

There were 36 households, out of which 44.4% had children under the age of 18 living with them, 61.1% were married couples living together, 16.7% had a female householder with no husband present, and 16.7% were non-families. 13.9% of all households were made up of individuals, and 8.3% had someone living alone who was 65 years of age or older. The average household size was 3.06 and the average family size was 3.30.

In the city, the population was spread out, with 39.1% under the age of 18, 7.3% from 18 to 24, 28.2% from 25 to 44, 13.6% from 45 to 64, and 11.8% who were 65 years of age or older. The median age was 29 years. For every 100 females, there were 107.5 males. For every 100 females age 18 and over, there were 116.1 males.

The median income for a household in the city was $23,125, and the median income for a family was $24,375. Males had a median income of $16,607 versus $18,750 for females. The per capita income for the city was $8,927. There were 17.4% of families and 29.3% of the population living below the poverty line, including 52.2% of under eighteens and 25.0% of those over 64.

References

External links
 Encyclopedia of Oklahoma History and Culture - Centrahoma

Cities in Coal County, Oklahoma
Cities in Oklahoma